The 1947 Assam earthquake occurred on 29 July at 13:43 UTC with an  of 7.3 and a maximum EMS-98 intensity of V (Strong).

Earthquake
The earthquake was located near the border between India and Tibet. Some sources put the epicenter in India, and some put it in Tibet. The released seismic moment was about 1.5×1020 Nm. The mechanism of the earthquake is not well known. In the Chinese literature, this earthquake was often located around the Nang County, Tibet.

Damage
In Dibrugarh, Jorhat, and Tezpur, there were cracks in walls. Failure of electricity was reported in Guwahati.

Other seismicity
The border region was struck by the much larger 8.6  Assam–Tibet earthquake three years later, on August 15, 1950.

See also
 List of earthquakes in 1947
 List of earthquakes in India

References

External links

Assam earthquake, 1947
1947 in India
1947 in China
1947
1947
1940s in Assam
Disasters in Assam
History of Tibet
1947
1947 disasters in China
1947 disasters in India